Squalius tenellus is a species of ray-finned fish in the family Cyprinidae. It is endemic to the Cetina River drainage in Croatia.

References

Squalius
Fish described in 1843